Sitwell Ward is a ward in the Metropolitan Borough of Rotherham, South Yorkshire, England.  The ward contains four listed buildings that are recorded in the National Heritage List for England.  All the listed buildings are designated at Grade II, the lowest of the three grades, which is applied to "buildings of national importance and special interest".  The ward is a suburb to the southeast of the centre of Rotherham and is residential.  The listed buildings consist of two mileposts, a large house, and an open air school.


Buildings

References

Citations

Sources

 

Lists of listed buildings in South Yorkshire
Buildings and structures in Rotherham